Renshaw may refer to:

 USS Renshaw, several US Navy ships with this name
 Renshaw (surname), people with the surname Renshaw

See also
 Renshaw cell